Cyclothone alba, commonly known as the bristlemouth, is a species of ray-finned fish in the genus Cyclothone. It is found across the world, in the Pacific, Indian, and Atlantic Oceans.

The species was originally described as a subspecies of Cyclothone signata: Cyclothone signata alba, by Brauer in 1906.

References 

Gonostomatidae
Fish described in 1906